Geoffrey Bryson Fisken,  (17 February 1916 – 12 June 2011) was a New Zealand fighter pilot who was the British Commonwealth's leading air ace in the Pacific theatre of World War II. He is credited with shooting down 11 Japanese aircraft.

Early life
Geoffrey Fisken was born in Gisborne, in New Zealand, on 17 February 1916. He was the son of a farmer, and entered that profession himself, farming sheep at Masterton. Fisken learnt to fly privately during the 1930s, taking lessons in a DH60 Gypsy Moth.

Military career
In September 1939, at the outbreak of World War II Fisken volunteered for the Royal New Zealand Air Force, but was initially barred from enlisting. At the time in New Zealand farming was a reserved occupation as it was considered vital for the war effort, and therefore it was not until early 1940 that Fisken was able to enlist, after convincing his employer to release him for service. Following this Fisken was accepted as a pilot and undertook training at Bell Block in New Plymouth and also at Ohakea, before graduating as a Sergeant Pilot in 1941.

Singapore and Malaya
In February 1941, Fisken was posted to Singapore to join No. 205 Squadron RAF which was flying Short Singapore flying boats at the time. When he arrived, however, he discovered that these machines were being transferred to No. 5 Squadron RNZAF, so Fisken was instead sent to complete a fighter conversion course on Royal Australian Air Force CAC Wirraways, and Brewster Buffaloes. Upon completion of this course, he was posted to No. 67 Squadron RAF, which was primarily made up of New Zealanders at the time and was in the process of forming at Kallang along with No. 243 Squadron RAF.

The all-metal monoplane Buffaloes that equipped these squadrons were an advance on the biplanes that Fisken was used to, as well as the Wirraways he had flown during his fighter training.  However, the stubby Buffalo has acquired a mixed reputation as a fighter. Successful in Finnish hands against the Soviets during 1941–44, nevertheless it was placed on second-line duties by the Royal Air Force, who found the aircraft that arrived in Singapore had multiple faults, including secondhand poorly-conditioned engines, design flaws in the undercarriage, and unserviceable weapons and oxygen. As increasing numbers of aircraft arrived at the end of 1941, local modifications were hurriedly contrived to make them more battle ready. 

In October 1941, as fears of Japanese aggression increased, No. 67 Squadron moved to Mingaladon, Burma, but Fisken was posted back to Kallang to join No. 243 Squadron.

The Japanese attacked Allied territories in Asia and the Pacific on 8 December 1941. Initially, No. 243 Squadron concentrated on the unsuccessful defence of HMS Prince of Wales and HMS Repulse. Fisken was flying one of two Buffaloes to arrive at the sinkings first, describing the scene as "a grey metal bow sticking out of the sea, surrounded by an oil slick and many bodies". As the Japanese advanced down the Malay Peninsula, Singapore came under an increasing number of bombing raids, and 243 Squadron was tasked with defending the city.

On 16 December, Fisken claimed a victory over a Zero. A fortnight later, on 29 December, he claimed two unidentified Japanese bombers. On 12 January 1942, Fisken claimed a Nakajima Ki-27. He claimed a Mitsubishi A6M Zero two days later on 14 January, being lucky to land after being caught in the explosion of the Japanese plane. On 17 January, he shot down, or assisted in the destruction of, three Mitsubishi G3M bombers, and four days later brought down another fighter.

By this time, 243 Squadron had lost the majority of its pilots and virtually all its aircraft. As a result, it was merged with the Australian No. 453 Squadron RAAF, which continued to operate, along with No. 488 Squadron RNZAF. Fisken claimed another fighter on 1 February. Five days later, he was "bounced" by two Japanese fighters. He nevertheless shot one down, but only narrowly escaped the other, being injured in the arm and leg by a cannon shell before the dogfight ended. He was evacuated to New Zealand shortly before Singapore fell.

No. 14 Squadron RNZAF
In late March the RNZAF formed the surviving pilots from No. 243 and 488 Squadrons into No. 14 Squadron RNZAF at Ohakea. Employed in the home defence role, they were initially equipped with Harvards, while awaiting delivery of Curtiss P-40 Kittyhawks.

As a result of his performance in Singapore, Fisken received a commission and was promoted to the rank of pilot officer. In April 1943, he joined No. 14 Squadron at Wigram. Later the squadron was posted to the New Hebrides where they were based at Palikulo Bay Airfield on Espiritu Santo, before moving to the front line at Kukum Field on Guadalcanal on 11 June 1943. The following day Fisken destroyed two more Zeroes. On 4 July, flying the colourful P-40 "Wairarapa Wildcat" he had his last victories, destroying a further two Zekes and a Mitsubishi G4M. "Wairarapa Wildcat" also had success in the hands of other pilots. NZ3072 was scrapped after the war, but NZ3009 was restored and painted to represent NZ3072 "Wairarapa Wildcat".

In September 1943 Fisken was awarded the Distinguished Flying Cross. However, he found himself increasingly troubled by the injuries he had received in Singapore, and was medically discharged from the RNZAF in December 1943.

Although his last victories in the Solomons were clearly documented, the number of his confirmed victories (as against probables) over Singapore has been contested, giving rise to totals of between 10 and 13 in different texts. Nevertheless, his final score is believed to be 11 confirmed kills and he is considered to be the highest scoring British Commonwealth ace in the Pacific theatre.

Later life
Following his discharge from the RNZAF, Fisken returned to farming in Masteron. He was later employed by the Egg Marketing Board after selling his farm before eventually retiring in 1976 after another period farming, this time at Te Puke. He died on 12 June 2011 at Lara Lodge in Rotorua where he had lived for 31 years. His wife, Rhoda, predeceased him by 14 years. Together they had six children, five boys and a girl.

Notes
 Footnotes

 Citations

References

External links
Geoffrey Fisken oral history interview, conducted 21 February 2007 for the National Museum of the Pacific War

1916 births
2011 deaths
New Zealand farmers
New Zealand World War II pilots
New Zealand World War II flying aces
Recipients of the Distinguished Flying Cross (United Kingdom)
Royal New Zealand Air Force personnel
People from Gisborne, New Zealand